Sci Fiction was an online magazine which ran from 2000 to 2005.  At one time, it was the leading online science fiction magazine.  Published by Syfy and edited by Ellen Datlow, the work won multiple awards before it was discontinued.

History 
The magazine was created by what was then the US Sci Fi Channel (now Syfy), and hosted at SCIFI.COM.  The webzine starting publishing in May 2000.  The principal editor was Ellen Datlow, who had previously edited two other online magazines: The online incarnation of OMNI, and Event Horizon.

The webzine first made a splash when Linda Nagata's "Goddesses" won the Nebula Award for Best Novella for 2000. It was the first time that a piece of fiction originally published on a website won a Nebula. In 2002 Ellen Datlow won her first Hugo Award for Best Editor. In 2003 stories from the webzine won three awards, the Nebula Awards for Best Short Story ("What I Didn't See" by Karen Joy Fowler) and Best Novelette ("The Empire of Ice Cream" by Jeffrey Ford), and the Theodore Sturgeon Award for Lucius Shepard's novella "Over Yonder". In 2005, Datlow won her second Hugo Award for Best Editor and the website itself won a Hugo for Best Website. She also won her first Locus Award for Best Editor in 2005.

In late 2005 the SciFi Channel announced that it would be shutting down the magazine. This decision was evidently made because the magazine was not a major revenue generator for the channel.  SCIFI announced their intention to remove the Sci Fiction archived content as of June 2007, although some of it was still available over a year later. It has since been removed completely.

List of Sci Fiction short stories

Original stories published in the year 2000

Classics

See also
 List of defunct American periodicals

References

External resources

 Sci Fiction archive
 Sci Fiction's awards and nominations at The Locus Index to Science Fiction Awards
 List of all stories published in Sci Fiction

Online magazines published in the United States
Defunct science fiction magazines published in the United States
Magazines established in 2000
Magazines disestablished in 2005
Science fiction webzines
Hugo Award-winning works